Warren Norris (born 19 September 1974) is a Canadian former professional ice hockey centre who last played for EC KAC in the Austrian Hockey League. He has previously played in the American Hockey League (AHL) and the International Hockey League (IHL) in North America and in the British Ice Hockey Superleague, the Slovak Extraliga and the Swiss Nationalliga A. He has also played two seasons with the touring Canadian national ice hockey team.

Playing career
Whilst playing for the UMass Minutemen at the University of Massachusetts Amherst in 1996–97, Norris signed with the St. John's Maple Leafs of the AHL as a free agent. He also played for St. John's the following season, 1997–98, before he joined the Grand Rapids Griffins in the IHL for the 1998–99 and 1999–00 seasons. However, Norris only played a handful of games for Grand Rapids as he spent the majority of those seasons with the Canadian touring team for whom he made 78 appearances.

In 2000, Norris went to the United Kingdom where he joined the Sheffield Steelers for the 2000–01 ISL season. During this season, Norris helped Sheffield win a Grand Slam of all available trophies when they won the Benson & Hedges Cup, the Challenge Cup, the league championship and the playoffs. The following season, 2001–02, Norris joined Slovan Bratislava in the Slovak Extraliga before rejoining Sheffield for the 2002–03 season. During his second spell with Sheffield, Norris again helped them to win the Challenge Cup and the league championship.

Norris signed for the Graz 99ers in the Austrian Hockey League for the 2003–04 season. Playing for Graz for three seasons, he was the club's top point scorer in the 2003–04 and 2004–05 seasons and the club's and the league's top goal scorer in 2004–05. Norris finished the 2005–06 season playing one game for Lugano in the Swiss Nationalliga A playoffs before he returned to the Austrian Hockey League to play for the EC KAC in 2006–07. After three years with EC KAC, Norris signed with League rival Graz 99ers on 23 April 2009 for the 2009–10 season.

Personal life 
Norris is the younger brother of the former National Hockey League player Dwayne Norris and the uncle of Ottawa Senators forward Josh Norris.

Records
Most points (54) in 2003–04 for Graz 99ers.
Most goals (40) in the 2004–05 Austrian Hockey League season.
Most goals (40) and most points (67) in 2004–05 for Graz 99ers.

Career statistics

International play
Played for Canada in:
1998–99 touring team
1999–00 touring team

International statistics

References
European Hockey.Net
The Internet Hockey Database

External links

1974 births
Living people
Canadian ice hockey centres
Grand Rapids Griffins players
Graz 99ers players
HC Lugano players
HC Slovan Bratislava players
Ice hockey people from Newfoundland and Labrador
Kalamazoo Wings (1974–2000) players
EC KAC players
Sheffield Steelers players
Sportspeople from St. John's, Newfoundland and Labrador
St. John's Maple Leafs players
University of Massachusetts Amherst alumni
Canadian expatriate ice hockey players in England
Canadian expatriate ice hockey players in Austria
Canadian expatriate ice hockey players in Slovakia
Canadian expatriate ice hockey players in Switzerland
Canadian expatriate ice hockey players in the United States